In mathematics, weight space may refer to:

 Weight space (representation theory)
 Parameter space in artificial neural networks, where the parameters are weights on graph edges.